Chandisar is a village in Dholka Taluka in Ahmedabad District of Gujarat State, India. Chandisar is located near the bank of the Sabarmati River, 34 km towards south from District headquarters Ahmedabad, 9 km from Dholka and 64 km from State capital Gandhinagar.

Gallery

References 

Villages in Ahmedabad district
Settlements in Gujarat